Novy Mir is a rural locality (a settlement) in Logovskoy Selsoviet, Pervomaysky District, Altai Krai, Russia. The population was 400 as of 2013. There is 1 street.

Geography 
Novy Mir is located 40 km northeast of Novoaltaysk (the district's administrative centre) by road. Logovskoye is the nearest rural locality.

References 

Rural localities in Pervomaysky District, Altai Krai